Oscar John Georgy (November 25, 1916 – January 15, 1999) was a Major League Baseball pitcher who played in one game for the New York Giants on June 4, 1938. He pitched in one inning in relief, allowing two earned runs in the Giants' 2–11 loss to the Cincinnati Reds at Crosley Field.

References

External links

1916 births
1999 deaths
Major League Baseball pitchers
Baseball players from Louisiana
New York Giants (NL) players